Ami Shudhu Cheyechi Tomay is a 2014 Bengali-language action comedy film directed by Ashok Pati and Anonno Mamun and produced by Ashok Dhanuka under the banner of Eskay Movies. The film was co-produced by Action Cut Entertainment. The film features Bengali actors Ankush Hazra, Subhashree Ganguly and Vikram Chatterjee in the lead roles. A co-production of India and Bangladesh and it is an official remake of the 2009 Telugu-language film Arya 2. The music for the film was composed by Savvy Gupta, Hridoy Khan and Akassh.

This is the fourth collaboration between Ankush and Eskay Movies, after Idiot, Kanamachi, and Khiladi. This is the third collaboration between Subhasree and Eskay Movies, after Khokababu and Khoka 420. This is also Ankush and Subhasree's first Indo-Bangladeshi joint venture film.

Plot 
The film follows Abhijeet, played by Ankush, who is lonely college student who craves friendship. After meeting Bhoomi, played by Subhashree Ganguly, Abhijeet seeks her friendship.

Cast 
 Ankush Hazra as Abhijeet / Abhi
  Rafin Iqbal Kaif as Little Abhijeet
 Subhashree Ganguly as Bhoomi
 Shrosta Sarkar Sithi as Little Bhoomi
 Vikram Chatterjee as Joy
 Misha Sawdagor as Pratap Chowdhury, Bhoomi's father
 Supriyo Dutta as Talukdar
 Kharaj Mukherjee as college principal
 Shanta Islam
 Shakuntala Barua
 Maliha Nusrat as Imonrag/ Imon / Joy's Girlfriend
 Meghla Mukta
 Mahamuh Alam Kochi
 Pijush Bandyopadhyay
 Sanjit Mahato 
 Naznin Alam 
 Pathorokhi Chakraborty 
 Rahmat Ali

Production 
The film is an international co-production between India's Eskay Movies and Bangladesh's Action Cut Entertainment. This began a trend of new Indo-Bangladeshi joint ventures in film, many of which were also produced by Eskay Movies.

Development 
The filming of Ami Shudhu Cheyechi Tomay began on 26 September 2013. According to the director, apart from being a typical romantic comedy-drama film, Ami Shudhu Cheyechi Tomay also has a social message for its viewers. Initially, the leading role was offered to Tollywood star Dev, but due to scheduling problems he rejected the offer. Ashok Pati's next choice was Ankush Hazra, who accepted the role. And for the role of 'Joy' co-director Anonno Mamun approached Bangladeshi actor Symon Sadik. But, after getting the story line Symon rejected the project.  A major portion of the film was shot in Pubail (Gazipur), Bangladesh, with the remaining portions filmed in India and Thailand. The title song was shot in Kutch, Gujarat. Actor Misha Sawdagor and newcomer Meghla have played important roles in the film.

Soundtrack 

The soundtrack of the film was composed Savvy Gupta and Akassh Sen from India and Hridoy Khan from Bangladesh.

The soundtrack was released in India on 1 January 2014 and in Bangladesh on 20 April 2015.

Both the India and Bangladesh releases of the soundtrack contain the same songs, but the order of the tracks differs.

The song "Obujh Bhalobasha" by Hridoy Khan is a new version of the song of the same name from Khan's 2009 album Bolna.

Track listing

India

Bangladesh

Reception 
A review by The Times of India praised the soundtrack and the composers, Savvy Gupta, Hridoy Khan and Akassh Sen, for the foot-tapping numbers. However, the film also noted that film's placement of certain songs in the film were "out of nowhere", specifically "Calling Bell" and "Tumi Jodi", the latter of which was listed in the soundtrack as "Obujh Bhalobasha".

Release 
The film released on 16 May 2014.

Critical reception 
The Times of India praised director Ashok Pati for being visually treat and keeping the story together, but also criticized some scenes in the middle for being mindless and yawning. Calling the film and out-and-out entertainer, the review gave the film 3/5 stars.

References

External links
 

2014 films
2010s Bengali-language films
2014 romantic comedy-drama films
Bengali-language Indian films
Bengali-language Bangladeshi films
Bangladeshi romantic comedy-drama films
Indian romantic comedy-drama films
Bengali remakes of Telugu films
Bangladeshi remakes of Indian films
Films scored by Savvy Gupta
Films scored by Akassh
Films scored by Hridoy Khan
Films directed by Ashok Pati
Films directed by Anonno Mamun
2014 comedy-drama films
Bangladeshi remakes of Telugu films